Yengi Qaleh-ye Kasbair (also Romanized as Yengī Qal‘eh-ye Kasbāīr) is a village in Badranlu Rural District, in the Central District of Bojnord County, North Khorasan Province, Iran. At the 2006 census, its population was 24, in 5 families.

References 

Populated places in Bojnord County